Giovanni Forni is an Italian mathematician at the University of Maryland known for his research in dynamical systems.

After graduating from the University of Bologna in 1989, he obtained his PhD in 1993 from Princeton University, under the supervision of John Mather.

He was an invited speaker at the 2002 International Congress of Mathematicians in Beijing.

For his work on solutions of cohomological equations for flows on surfaces, and on the Kontsevich–Zorich conjecture concerning deviation of ergodic averages, he was awarded the 2008 Michael Brin Prize in Dynamical Systems.

In 2012, he became a fellow of the American Mathematical Society.

References

Living people
Italian mathematicians
University of Bologna alumni
Princeton University alumni
University of Maryland, College Park faculty
Fellows of the American Mathematical Society
Dynamical systems theorists
Year of birth missing (living people)